Antoni Franz (26 January 1905 – 16 July 1965) was a Polish fencer. He competed in the individual and team épée events at the 1936 Summer Olympics.

References

1905 births
1965 deaths
Polish male fencers
Olympic fencers of Poland
Fencers at the 1936 Summer Olympics
Sportspeople from Lviv
People from the Kingdom of Galicia and Lodomeria
20th-century Polish people